Yesinguer Jiménez (born January 13, 1991) is a Colombian  football midfielder.

Titles

References

External links

1991 births
Living people
Colombian footballers
Colombian expatriate footballers
Association football midfielders
Once Caldas footballers
UB Conquense footballers
Deportivo Pereira footballers
Jaguares de Córdoba footballers
Boyacá Chicó F.C. footballers
Deportivo Sanarate F.C. players
Cerro Largo F.C. players
Deportivo Mictlán players
Categoría Primera A players
Categoría Primera B players
Segunda División B players
Uruguayan Segunda División players
Footballers from Medellín
Colombian expatriate sportspeople in Spain
Colombian expatriate sportspeople in Uruguay
Colombian expatriate sportspeople in Guatemala
Expatriate footballers in Spain
Expatriate footballers in Uruguay
Expatriate footballers in Guatemala